Douglas Silva Delfino (born April 22, 1983 in Porto Alegre), better known as Douglas Silva, is a Brazilian footballer who acts as the steering wheel. Currently, he plays for Esporte Clube Pelotas.

Career
He began his career at Grêmio.

Honours
Campeonato Brasileiro de Futebol Série B: 2007
Campeonato Paranaense de Futebol: 2008 e 2008

Contract
 Ceará.

External links
zerozerofootball.com

1983 births
Brazilian footballers
Living people
Grêmio Foot-Ball Porto Alegrense players
Coritiba Foot Ball Club players
Ceará Sporting Club players
Esporte Clube Pelotas players
Association football midfielders
Association football fullbacks
Footballers from Porto Alegre